Bissy-sur-Fley (literally Bissy on Fley) is a commune in the Saône-et-Loire department in the region of Bourgogne-Franche-Comté in eastern France.

Population

Sights
 15th-century castle known for its owner Pontus de Tyard a French poet member of La Pléiade. The castle has been protected as a historic site since 1932.

See also
Communes of the Saône-et-Loire department

References

Communes of Saône-et-Loire